The Maui Stingrays were a minor league baseball team in the Hawaii Winter Baseball league. They were based in Wailuku, Hawaii. They played their home games at Maehara Stadium.

For the 1994 season, Julie Croteau and Lee Anne Ketcham, teammates with the Colorado Silver Bullets, joined the Stingrays, becoming the first women to play in a Major League Baseball-sanctioned league.

Team Record

References

External links
 Hawaii Winter Baseball website

Defunct Hawaii Winter Baseball teams
1993 establishments in Hawaii
1997 disestablishments in Hawaii
Baseball teams established in 1993
Baseball teams disestablished in 1997
Defunct baseball teams in Hawaii